Chathill is a hamlet and former civil parish, now in the parish of Ellingham, in Northumberland, England. It is served by Chathill railway station.
It is on the main road serving Seahouses and the northern coast. In 1951 the parish had a population of 59.

Chathill is home to Preston Pele Tower, built between 1392 and 1399. One of its former owners was Sir Guiscard Harbottle of Beamish, who was killed at the Battle of Flodden. The tower has a clock, installed in 1864, which features mechanisms similar to Big Ben.

Governance 
Chathill is in the parliamentary constituency of Berwick-upon-Tweed. Chathill was formerly a township in Ellingham parish, from 1866 Chathill was a civil parish in its own right until it was abolished on 1 April 1955 and merged with Ellingham.

References

External links

Hamlets in Northumberland
Former civil parishes in Northumberland